Kathleen Myers (April 16, 1899 – September 27, 1959) was an American film actress of the silent era.

Biography
Myers was the daughter of S. C. Myers, manager of Chrome Steel Works in Newark, New Jersey.

Appearing in 22 feature films between 1921 and 1928, "graduating from straight comedies to comedy drama and feature plays." She also had lead roles in some films made in South America.

Myers was a leading lady in a number of action or adventure productions, including Dick Turpin (1925), in which she starred alongside Tom Mix. During the early 1920s she also appeared in a number of comedy shorts, often featuring Oliver Hardy.

Partial filmography

 Reputation (1921) - Ingenue (stage sequence)
 The Secret Four (1921)
 Captain Kidd (1922, Serial) - Louise Bradley
 Flaming Hearts (1922)
 Der Fluch der Habgier (1922)
 The Barnyard (1923, Short) - The Farmer's Daughter
 The Gown Shop (1923, Short) - Head saleslady
 Stolen Secrets (1924) - Cordelia Norton
 Babbitt (1924) - Miss McGoun
 Midnight Secrets (1924)
 Cheap Kisses (1924) - Mignon De Lisle
 Dick Turpin (1925) - Lady Alice Brookfield
 His Supreme Moment (1925) - Sara Deeping
 Heads Up (1925) - Angela
 Goat Getter (1925) - Virginia Avery
 Go West (1925) - His Daughter
 Smilin' at Trouble (1925) - Kathleen O'Toole
 The Traffic Cop (1926) - Alicia Davidson
 Sir Lumberjack (1926) - Bess Calhoun
 The Lucky Fool (1926) - Elma Saunders
 The Gentle Cyclone (1926) - Mary Wilkes
 Mulhall's Greatest Catch (1926) - Nora McCarren
 Kosher Kitty Kelly (1926) - Rosie Feinbaum
 The Flying Mail (1926) - Alice Hardwick
 Fourth Commandment (1927) - Mrs. Smith
 She's My Baby (1927) - Bernice Wilbur
 Ladies Beware (1927) - Georgette
 A Gentleman Preferred (1928) - Maryann Carter (final film role)

References

Bibliography
 Solomon, Aubrey. The Fox Film Corporation, 1915-1935: A History and Filmography. McFarland, 2011.

External links

1899 births
1959 deaths
American film actresses
People from Covington, Kentucky
Actresses from Kentucky
20th-century American actresses
American silent film actresses